Emily Eyefinger is a series of children's books written by Duncan Ball and illustrated by Craig Smith. They are about a girl who was born with an eye on the end of her finger.

Emily Eyefinger (Simon & Schuster Books for Young Readers, 1992)
Emily Eyefinger, Secret Agent (Simon & Schuster Books for Young Readers, 1993)
Emily Eyefinger and the Lost Treasure (Simon & Schuster Books for Young Readers, 1994)
Emily Eyefinger and the Black Volcano (Angus & Robertson, 2000)
Emily Eyefinger's Alien Adventure (Angus & Robertson, 2001)
Emily Eyefinger and the Devil Bones (HarperCollins, 2002)
Emily Eyefinger and the Balloon Bandits (Angus & Robertson, 2003)
Emily Eyefinger and the Ghost Ship (Angus & Robertson, 2004)
Emily Eyefinger and the Puzzle in the Jungle (Angus & Robertson, 2005)
Emily Eyefinger and the City in the Sky (HarperCollins, 2006)
Emily Eyefinger and the Secret from the Sea (HarperCollins, 2012)

Collected volumes:
An Eyeful of Emily (books 1–4, 2007)
Eyespy Emily Eyefinger (books 5–8, 2008)

References

Series of children's books
Australian children's books
1990s children's books
2000s children's books
2010s children's books